A runza (also called a bierock, krautburger, or kraut pirok) is a yeast dough bread pocket with a filling consisting of beef, cabbage or sauerkraut, onions, and seasonings. Runzas can be baked into various shapes such as a half-moon, a rectangle, a round (bun), a square, or a triangle. The runzas sold by the Runza restaurant chain are rectangular while many of the bierocks sold in Kansas are round buns.

The runza is a regional cuisine of Nebraska, with some commentators calling it "as Nebraskan as Cornhusker football." It is served by the Nebraska Society of Washington, D.C. and the Nebraska Society of New York at their Taste of Nebraska events and was chosen to represent the state at Flavored Nation, an event serving iconic dishes from all fifty states.

History
The runza sandwich originated from pirog, a Russian baked good or more specifically from its small version, known as pirozhok (literally "little pirog"). Volga Germans, ethnic Germans who settled in the Volga River valley in Russia at the invitation of Catherine the Great in the 18th century, adapted the pirog/pirozhok to create the bierock, a yeast pastry sandwich with similar savory ingredients. When the political climate turned against the Volga Germans, many emigrated to the United States, creating communities across the Great Plains. These immigrants, including the Brening family that settled near Sutton, Nebraska, brought their bierock recipes with them. Sarah "Sally" Everett (née Brening), originally of Sutton, is credited with adapting her family's bierock recipe into the runza and also inventing the name for the sandwich. In 1949, Everett went into business selling runzas with her brother Alex in Lincoln.

Etymology 
The word "runza" is registered as a trademark in the United States, held by the Runza restaurant chain.

See also
 Fleischkuekle
 List of American sandwiches
 List of regional dishes of the United States
 List of sandwiches
 List of stuffed dishes

References

External links 
 A runza recipe
 Original Runza Recipe
 Runza recipe with picture 

American sandwiches
German-Russian culture in the United States
Nebraska culture
Stuffed dishes
Restaurants in Nebraska
Companies based in Lincoln, Nebraska
Regional restaurant chains in the United States
Fast-food chains of the United States
German-American cuisine
German restaurants
Fast-food hamburger restaurants
Restaurants established in 1949